Arthur Upton (Arthur Percy Upton, 1777–1855) was a British soldier, politician and cricketer.

Arthur Upton may also refer to:

 Arthur Upton (died 1662), English MP for Devon
 Arthur Upton (1623–1706), Irish MP for Carrickfergus, Antrim and County Antrim
 Arthur Upton (1715–1768), Irish MP for Carrickfergus
 Arthur Upton (South African cricketer) (Arthur Louis Upton, born 1923), cricketer